Abnormality (or dysfunctional behavior) is a behavioral characteristic assigned to those with conditions that are regarded as rare or dysfunctional. Behavior is considered to be abnormal when it is atypical or out of the ordinary, consists of undesirable behavior, and results in impairment in the individual's functioning. Abnormality in behavior, is that in which is considered deviant from specific societal, cultural and ethical expectations. These expectations are broadly dependent on age, gender, traditional and societal categorizations. The definition of abnormal behavior is an often debated issue in abnormal psychology, because of these subjective variables.

Abnormal behavior should not be confused with unusual behavior. Behavior that is out of the ordinary is not necessarily indicative of a mental or psychological disorder. Abnormal behavior, on the other hand, while not a mental disorder in itself, is often an indicator of a possible mental and/or psychological disorder. A psychological disorder is defined as an "ongoing dysfunctional pattern of thought, emotion, and behavior that causes significant distress, and is considered deviant in that person's culture or society". Abnormal behavior, as it relates to psychological disorders, would be "ongoing" and a cause of "significant distress". A mental disorder describes a patient who has a medical condition whereby the medical practitioner makes a judgment that the patient is exhibiting abnormal behavior based on the Diagnostic and Statistical Manual of Mental Disorders, Fifth Edition (DSM-5) criteria. Thus, simply because a behavior is unusual it does not make it abnormal; it is only considered abnormal if it meets these criteria. The DSM-5 is used by both researchers and clinicians in diagnosing a potential mental disorder. The criteria needed to be met in the DSM-5 vary for each mental disorder.

Unlike physical abnormalities in one's health where symptoms are objective, psychology health professionals cannot use objective symptoms when evaluating someone for abnormalities in behavior.

Several conventional criteria
There are five main criteria of abnormality. They are:
 Statistical Criterion
 Social Criterion
 Personal Discomfort (Distress)
 Maladaptive Behavior
 Deviation from Ideal

Abnormal behaviors are "actions that are unexpected and often evaluated negatively because they differ from typical or usual behavior".

The following criteria are subjective:
 Maladaptive and malfunctional behaviors: behaviors, which, due to circumstance, are not fully adapted to the environment. Instead, they become malfunctional and detrimental to the individual, or others. For example, a mouse continuing to attempt to escape when escape is obviously impossible.
 Behavior that violates the standards of society. When people do not follow the conventional social and moral rules of their society, the behavior is considered to be abnormal.
 Observer discomfort. If a person's behavior brings discomfort to those in observation, it is likely to be considered abnormal.

The standard criteria in psychology and psychiatry is that of mental illness or mental disorder. Determination of abnormality in behavior is based upon medical diagnosis.

Other criteria include:
 Statistical infrequency: statistically rare behaviors are called abnormal. Though not always the case, the presence of abnormal behavior in people is usually rare or statistically unusual. Any specific abnormal behavior may be unusual, but it is not uncommon for people to exhibit some form of prolonged abnormal behavior at some point in their lives.
 Deviation from social norms: behavior that is deviant from social norms is defined as the departure or deviation of an individual from society's unwritten rules (norms). For example, if one were to witness a person jumping around, nude, on the streets, the person would likely be perceived as abnormal to most people, as they have broken society's norms about wearing clothing. There are also a number of criteria for one to examine before reaching a judgment as to whether someone has deviated from society's norms:
 Culture; what may be seen as normal in one culture, may be seen as abnormal in another. 
 Situation & context one is placed in; for example, going to the toilet is a normal human act, but going in the middle of a supermarket would be most likely seen as highly abnormal, i.e., defecating or urinating in public is illegal as a misdemeanor act of indecent public conduct.
 Age; a child at the age of three could get away with taking off clothing in public, but not a person at the age of twenty.
 Gender: a male responding with behavior normally reacted to as female, and vice versa, is often likely to be seen as abnormal or deviant from social norms. 
 Historical context; standards of normal behavior change in some societies, sometimes very rapidly.
 Failure to function adequately: behavior that is abnormal. These criteria are necessary to label an abnormality as a disorder, if the individual is unable to cope with the demands of everyday life. Psychologists can disagree on the boundaries that define what is 'functioning' and what is 'adequately', however, as some behaviors that can cause 'failure to function' are not seen as bad. For example, firefighters risking their lives to save people in a blazing fire may be ‘failing to function’ in the fact that they are risking their lives, and in another context, their actions could be construed as pathological, but within the context of being a firefighter said risks are not at odds with adequate functioning.
 Deviation from ideal mental health: defines abnormality by determining if the behavior the individual is displaying is affecting their mental well-being. As with the failure to function definition, the boundaries that stipulate what 'ideal mental health' is are not clearly defined. A frequent problem with the definition is that all individuals at some point in their life deviate from ideal mental health, but it does not mean the behavior is abnormal. For example, someone who has lost a relative is distressed and deviates from "ideal mental health" for a time, but their distress is not defined as abnormal, as distress is an expected reaction.

A common approach to defining abnormality is a multi-criteria approach, where all definitions of abnormality are used to determine whether an individual's behavior is abnormal. For example, psychologists would be prepared to define an individual's behavior as "abnormal" if the following criteria are met:
 The individual is engaging in behavior that is preventing them from functioning.
 The individual is engaging in behavior that breaks a social norm.
 The individual is engaging in behavior that is statistically infrequent.

A good example of an abnormal behavior assessed by a multi-criteria approach is depression: it is commonly seen as a deviation from ideal mental stability, it often stops the individual from 'functioning' in normal life, and, although it is a relatively common mental disorder, it is still statistically infrequent. Most people do not experience significant major depressive disorder in their lifetime. Thus, depression and its associated behaviors would be considered abnormal.

See also

 Anti-social behaviour
 Deviance
 Dysfunctional family
 Eccentricity (behavior)
 List of abnormal behaviors in animals
 Norm (social)
 Normalization (sociology)
 Psychopathy
 Social alienation

Notes and references

Problem behavior
Deviance (sociology)